Commodore 64 joystick adapters are hardware peripherals that extend the number of joystick ports on the Commodore 64 computer. The additional joysticks can be used on games with dedicated support for the specific adapter.

A number of different joystick adapters have been constructed for use with the C64. The Classical Games / Protovision adapter is by far supported by the largest number of games. While building instructions are available for most of the adapters, a few adapters are also available commercially. The adapters are also emulated in some of the C64 emulators.

Original Adapters

Starbyte adapter (1990)  
Supports 2 additional joysticks at the userport. Released by Starbyte Software in 1990 for use with their game Adidas Championship Tie Break. At the time sold separately under the name Tie Break Adaptor.

Building instructions (plugs and wires only) have been reverse engineered and made available by Groepaz/Hitmen.

Kingsoft adapter (1992) 
Supports 2 additional joysticks at the userport. Introduced with the game Bug Bomber by Kingsoft in 1992. The game came with instructions to build your own 4-player adapter.

Building instructions (plugs and wires only) have been reverse engineered and made available by Groepaz/Hitmen.

Protovision 4 player interface / Classical Games adapter (1997) 
Supports 2 additional joysticks at the userport. Designed by Chester Kollschen (CKX) of Classical Games and released in 1997 with the game Bomb Mania. Kollschen later joined Protovision and the adapter is now available as the Protovision 4 player interface.

Building instructions (plugs, wires and an IC), sample code, shop and list of supported games are available at the Protovision website.

Space Balls adapter (1998) 
Supports 8 joysticks, all connected to the user port and one joyport. Designed by Luigi Pantarotto and released with the game Space Balls (1998) for 2-8 players.

Building instructions (plugs and wires only) is provided with the game Space Balls (called Star Balls in its schematics page).

Ninjas SNES pad adapter (1998) 
Supports 8 SNES pads at the joyports. Designed by Ninja of The Dreams.

Building instructions (plugs and wires only) are available at the Hitmen 4 player adapter website. Code interface is demonstrated in the SNES-Pad-Tooldisk #1.

Digital Excess & Hitmen 4 player joystick adapter (1999) 
Supports 2 additional joysticks at the userport. Designed by Groepaz of Hitmen and Thomas Koncina and Bjoern Odendahl of Digital Excess in 1999 as an easier to build alternative to the Classical Games adapter.

Building instructions (plugs and wires only) and sample code is available at the Hitmen 4 player adapter website.

Inception – 8 joysticks adapter (2013) 

Supports 8 joysticks at one joystick port. Designed by Ray and PCH (Petr Chlud).

Available commercially at the c64.cz website.

Compatible Adapters

Singular Crew 4Player Adapter (2008) 
Supports 2 additional joysticks at the userport. Compatible with the Protovision 4 player interface / the Classical Games Adapter, Digital Excess & Hitmen 4 player joystick adapter and the Kingsoft Adapter. 
Designed by Singular Crew.

Available commercially at www.zsibvasar.hu website.

Related Adapters 
Adapters for a few related computers can also be used with the C64. Those adapters include PET (normally only used on the PET/CBM2), Hummer (normally only used on the C64DTV) and OEM (normally only used on the VIC20). There are probably no game supporting those adapters on the C64.

In addition, adapters have been made that give Commodore 64 games the ability to provide rumble feedback to modern controllers.

Emulation 
The C64 emulator VICE supports the Classical Games / Protovision and the Digital Excess & Hitmen adapters from version 2.3., and the Kingsoft and Starbyte adapters from version 2.4.

Supported games 
A (near) complete list of games with original or added support for the various adapters.

Adapter:
S = Starbyte, C = Protovision / Classical Games, D = Digital Excess & Hitmen, N = Ninjas SNES pad, K = Kingsoft, B = Space Balls, I = Inception

Description:
original/clone = new implementation, patch = patch for existing game, hack = unauthorized release based on existing game.

Interface origin:
Publisher or official source of joystick adapter support. In order to use hacked versions legally, you should own the original game.

References

External links 
Protovision 4 player interface page, shop and list of compatible games
Hitmen building instruction on 4 player adapters and list of 4 player games
C64.cz Inception 8 joysticks adapter interface, shop and list of compatible games

Commodore 64
Home computer peripherals